Dawid is a Polish masculine given name, related to David, and more rarely a surname. People with the name include:

Given name
 Dawid Abrahamowicz (1839–1926), Polish politician
 Dawid Abramowicz (born 1991), Polish footballer
 Dawid Moryc Apfelbaum, fictitious World War II Polish Army officer and a commander of the Jewish Military Union
 Dawid Bezuidenhout (1935–1998), teacher and politician in South West Africa
 Dawid Celt (born 1985), Polish tennis player and coach
 Dawid Daniuszewski (1885–1944), Polish chess master
 Dawid Dryja (born 1992), Polish volleyball player
 Dawid Dynarek (born 1989), Polish footballer
 Dawid Dzięgielewski (born 1993), Polish footballer
 Dawid Jackiewicz (born 1973), Polish politician and former Minister of State Treasury
 Dawid Janowski (1868–1927), Polish-born French chess player
 Dawid Jarka (born 1987), Polish footballer
 Dawid Kamiński (born 1995), Polish footballer
 Dawid Kasperski (born 1990), Polish Muay Thai kickboxer
 Dawid Kellerman, 21st century South African rugby union player
 Dawid Kocyła (born 2002), Polish footballer
 Dawid Kort (born 1995), Polish footballer
 Dawid Kostecki (1981–2019), Polish boxer
 Dawid Kownacki (born 1997), Polish footballer
 Dawid Kręt (born 1988), Polish football goalkeeper
 Dawid Kruiper (1935–2012), traditional healer and leader of the ǂKhomani San
 Dawid Krupa (born 1980), Polish former cyclist
 Dawid Kubacki (born 1990), Polish ski jumper, twice world champion
 Dawid Kucharski (born 1984), Polish footballer
 Dawid Kudła (born 1992), Polish football goalkeeper
 Dawid Kupczyk (born 1977), Polish bobsledder
 Dawid Kurminowski (born 1999), Polish footballer
 Dawid Kwiatkowski (born 1996), Polish singer-songwriter
 Dawid Kwiek (born 1988), Polish-Canadian footballer
 Dawid Lande (1868–1928), Polish architect
 Dawid Malan (born 1987), English cricketer
 Dawid Nowak (born 1984), Polish footballer
 Dawid Ogrodnik (born 1986), Polish actor
 Dawid Plizga (born 1985), Polish footballer
 Dawid Podsiadło (born 1993), Polish singer-songwriter
 Dawid Przepiórka (1880–1940), Polish chess player
 Dawid Przysiek (born 1987), Polish handball player
 Dawid Rogalski (born 1996), Polish footballer
 Dawid Ryndak (born 1989), Polish footballer
 Dawid Sarkisow (born 1982), Turkmen footballer
 Dawid Szot (born 2001), Polish footballer
 Dawid Szufryn (born 1986), Polish football player
 Dawid Szymonowicz (born 1995), Polish footballer
 Dawid Tomala (born 1989), Polish race walker
 Dawid Wdowiński (1895–1970), Polish-born American psychiatrist and doctor of neurology and political leader of a World War II Jewish resistance organization
 Dawid Żebrowski (born 1997), Polish hurdler

Surname
 Jan Władysław Dawid (1859–1914), Polish teacher, psychologist, and pioneer of educational psychology and experimental pedagogy
 Philip Dawid (born 1946), British statistician

Masculine given names
Polish masculine given names